It Isn't Jacques Cartier's Fault is a Canadian comedy film, directed by Clément Perron and Georges Dufaux and released in 1968. The film centres on a family of American tourists in Montreal, who are being accompanied around the city by a tour guide who is romantically interested in the family's oldest daughter.

The film's cast includes Jacques Desrosiers, Michèle Chicoine, Mary Gay, Michael Devine, Paul Buissonneau, Lisette Gervais and Paul Hébert.

It was an entrant for Best Feature Film at the Canadian Film Awards, but lost to The Ernie Game.

References

External links

1968 films
Canadian comedy films
National Film Board of Canada films
Films directed by Clément Perron
French-language Canadian films
1960s Canadian films